Krysada Panusith Phounsiri (born March 20, 1988) is a Lao-American artist and engineer based in San Diego, California.

Family life
He emigrated to America with his family in 1989 from Hoyaxai, Bokeo, Laos. He is nicknamed "Binly" in many circles. He grew up in San Diego, California. He obtained his United States citizenship in November, 2009.

Education
Krysada Panusith Phounsiri attended Eastlake High School in Chula Vista, California. He graduated from University of California, Berkeley in 2010 with a Physics & Astrophysics Double Major with a Minor in Poetry.

Writing and dance
His work has been featured in the Journal of Southeast Asian American Education and Advancement, Little Laos on the Prairie, the Twin Cities Daily Planet, Asian American Press, and the Smithsonian Asian Pacific American Center’s “A Day In The Life Of Asian America” digital exhibit.

Krysada Panusith Phounsiri's debut collection of poetry “Dance Among Elephants,” was published by Sahtu Press in 2015. It is a collection of poetry and photography that explored the challenge of identity politics, ideology, and the music of relationships between families and communities rebuilding their lives. It was released during the 40th anniversary of the Lao Diaspora that began with the end of the Laotian Secret War in 1975.

He pushes his passion for dancing, mainly the Hip Hop Street Dance known as Breaking, by traveling to various regions of the world to compete in competitions and teach workshops.  He is also involved in developing the Snap Pilots Photography Project; a venture he and a friend created.

Professional life and community service
Krysada Panusith Phounsiri volunteers regularly with the Laotian American community, particularly in Southern California and for national organizations such as Laotian American National Alliance.

Awards and recognition
 Solo Boy Champion in Sweet Addiction 2007 in San Luis Potosí
 Footwork Champion at Mighty 4 San Francisco 2007
 Two-on-Two Champion at Headhunters Eight Year Anniversary in San Jose 2008
 1st Place at UC Davis Battle at the Buzz 2009
 1st Place at Skills to Pay the Bills 2010 in Vallejo, CA
 All Styles Champion at Town to the Boogie Down 2010 in Hayward, CA
 Redbull BC One Semi-Finalist 2012 in San Diego, CA
 Illest 2014 Crew Battle Champions | Pro Breaking Tour in Orange County, CA
 Style Elements 2014 Crew Battle Champions | Pro Breaking Tour in San Jose, CA
 Cell-E-Brate All Styles Champion and Breaking Battle Finalist in San Francisco, CA
 All the Way Live 2014 Crew Battle Champions in Fremont, CA
 Breaks Kru 2014 Anniversary Finalist in New York, NY
 R16 North American Solo Bboy Champion 2014 in Las Vegas, NV
 Circa 2015 Crew Battle Champions | Pro Breaking Tour in Las Vegas, NV
 Warsaw Challenge 2015 Crew Battle Champions in Warsaw, Poland
 West Coast Rockers Anniversary Finalist in Fullerton, CA
 2015 San Diego Delegate to the 2nd National Lao American Writers Summit.
 2016 Rhysling Award for Best Poem of the Year, Long Form, Science Fiction Poetry Association (Tie)

References

External links
Snap Pilots Photography
Binly AKA Lancer, Laotian American National Alliance, 2010
The Poetry of Breaking, Lao Americans, July 5, 2012
Dance Among Elephants, Sahtu Press
Sahtu Press Announces Forthcoming Title "Dance Among Elephants" Little Laos on the Prairie, October 20, 2014
Dance Among Elephants Available for Pre-Order, Asian American Press
An Interview with Krysada Phounsiri, Sahtu Press
Break-Dancer and Systems Engineer, Krysada Phounsiri aka Binly is a philosophical BBoy People With Careers Podcast
Selected poems of Krysada Binly Panusith Phounsiri, Journal of Southeast Asian American Education and Advancement

1988 births
Living people
American people of Laotian descent
People from San Diego
University of California, Berkeley alumni
Laotian poets
People from Bokeo province
American writers of Laotian descent
Writers from California
21st-century American poets
American male poets
21st-century American male writers